Quilter plc, formerly known as Old Mutual Wealth Management Limited, is a British multinational wealth management company formed to take over the UK wealth management business of Old Mutual plc after its separation of business. It is listed on the London Stock Exchange and is a constituent of the FTSE 250 Index. The stock has a secondary listing on the Johannesburg Stock Exchange (JSE).

History 

In March 2016, Old Mutual plc announced its managed separation strategy that sought to unlock and create value for shareholders through the separation of its four businesses, Old Mutual Emerging Markets, Nedbank, UK-based Old Mutual Wealth and Boston-based Old Mutual Asset Management (OMAM) into standalone entities. In November 2017, Old Mutual Wealth announced its intention to rebrand as Quilter plc and to list its shares on the London Stock Exchange (LSE) with secondary listings on the Johannesburg, Namibia, Malawi and Zimbabwe Stock Exchanges.

The firm selected Goldman Sachs, JP Morgan and Bank of America Merrill Lynch to lead its initial public offering which took place in June 2018 and which was estimated to have valued the company at $3.35 billion.

See also 
 Old Mutual
 UAP Old Mutual Holdings
 Nedbank
 Real People Group

References

External links
Official site

Financial services companies established in 2018
Companies listed on the London Stock Exchange
Financial services companies based in the City of London
Insurance companies of the United Kingdom
Investment management companies of the United Kingdom
Multinational companies based in the City of London
2018 initial public offerings
Corporate spin-offs